Xylotrechis aedon is a species of longhorn beetles of the family Cerambycidae. The species was described in 1903 by Karl Jordan.

This species is endemic to São Tomé and Príncipe, where it occurs on the island of São Tomé.

Its length is 11 mm.

References

Xylotrechus
Beetles of Africa
Beetles described in 1903
Invertebrates of São Tomé and Príncipe
Endemic fauna of São Tomé Island